Roxas, officially the Municipality of Roxas,  is a 1st class municipality in the province of Palawan, Philippines. According to the 2020 census, it has a population of 69,624 people.

Roxas was created under Republic Act No. 615 in 1951 from the barrios of Tinitian, Caramay, Rizal, Del Pilar, Malcampo, Tumarbong, Taradungan, Ilian, and Capayas of Puerto Princesa.

Geography
Roxas is located on the eastern coast of the island. Facing Sulu Sea.

Barangays

Roxas is politically subdivided into 31 barangays. Bagong Bayan was formerly a sitio of Ilian which is now part of the municipality of Dumaran).

Climate

Demographics

Economy

References

External links

Roxas Profile at PhilAtlas.com
[ Philippine Standard Geographic Code]
Philippine Census Information
Local Governance Performance Management System

Municipalities of Palawan